Wang Kwo-tsai (born 1959) is a Taiwanese politician.

Education
Wang obtained his bachelor's and master's degree in transportation management from National Cheng Kung University in 1981 and 1988 respectively. He then obtained his doctoral degree in traffic and transportation from National Chiao Tung University in 1995.

Political career
He took office as political deputy minister of transportation and communications on 20 May 2016, serving under Hochen Tan. Wang succeeded Wu Hong-mo as Minister of Transportation and Communications in December 2018.

References

Living people
Taiwanese Ministers of Transportation and Communications
1959 births